Pankit Thakker (born 14 March 1981) is an Indian actor who started his career in 2001 with Ekta Kapoor's extremely popular serial Kabhii Sautan Kabhii Sahelii which originally aired on DD Metro, and later ran on Star Plus, DD National, and TV Asia.

Since then he has done some of the most popular shows on Indian Television. His roles of Harsh Bhatia in Kabhii Sautan Kabhii Sahelii, and Dr. Atul Joshi in Dill Mill Gayye on Star One have garnered a lot of global appreciation.

Early life
Thakker was born in Mumbai, to a stockbroker father.

Personal life
Thakker was married to actress Prachi Thakker since 2000. They're living living separately since 2015, to file for divorce. He has a son with her.

Television
Television shows Thakker played on include:

 2001 - Kabhii Sautan Kabhii Sahelii as Harsh Bhatia - on Metro Gold
 2002 - Tu Kahe Agar as Karan - on Zee TV
 2002 - Kaagaz Kii Kashti - on Sahara One
Tamanna - on DD National
 2003 - Tum Bin Jaaoon Kahaan as Dhruv - on Zee TV
 2005 - Special Squad as Ajay Desai - on Star One
 2006 - Kumkum – Ek Pyara Sa Bandhan as Krishnakant - on Star Plus
 2006 India Calling - on Star One
 2006 Twinkle Beauty Parlour Lajpat Nagar - on SAB TV
 2006 - Mann Mein Hai Vishwas ( celebrity special) 
 2007-2010 - Dill Mill Gayye as Dr.Atul Joshi - on Star One
 2010 - Jaan Khilawan Jasooos ( celebrity special ) 
 2011 - Surya The SuperCop ( celebrity special ) 
 2011 - Dharampatni - on NDTV Imagine
 2013 - Kis Din Mera Viyaah Howega in triple role on Reliance Big Magic
 2015 - Yeh Hai Aashiqui (episode 90) - on Bindass
 2016 - Bahu Hamari Rajni Kant as Dhyan Kant - on Life Ok
 2019 - Tujhse Hai Raabta as Adinath (Episode 297-Episode 302; Episode 304-Episode 311) - on Zee TV
 2020 - Tara From Satara on Sony TV
 2021 - Aapki Nazron Ne Samjha as Chetan Rawal - on Star Plus
 2022 - Bohot Pyaar Karte Hai as Deep Malhotra - on Star Bharat
 2022 - Janam Janam Ka Saath as Vishwas (Kunwar Sa) on  Dangal

Web series
2015 - Fear Files: Har Mod Pe Darr
2020 - Scam 1992 as Head of ANZ Grindlays Bank (cameo)

References

External links
 
 

Living people
Indian male television actors
1981 births